Mark Kachanov is an American mechanical engineer, currently a professor at Tufts University and also the Editor-in-Chief of Elsevier's International Journal of Engineering Sciences and Springer's Letters in Fracture and Micromechanics.

References

Year of birth missing (living people)
Living people
Tufts University faculty
American mechanical engineers
Brown University alumni